Franz Streubel (born 24 September 1991) is a German former competitive figure skater. He is a two-time (2015–16) German national champion and has won six senior international medals, including gold at the 2012 Bavarian Open and 2014 NRW Trophy. He has finished in the top 15 at three European Championships.

Career
Streubel debuted on the ISU Junior Grand Prix series in 2007. His first senior international event was the 2007 Finlandia Trophy. He was coached by Karel Fajfr in Oberstdorf during the 2008–09 season. Vlasta Kopřivová and Michael Huth became Streubel's coaches the following season, working with him in Oberstdorf.

Streubel later trained in Berlin, coached by Karin Hendschke-Raddatz in the 2011–12 season and by Heidemarie Walther-Steiner in 2013–14. Streubel made his ISU Championship debut at the 2014 Europeans Championships in Budapest, Hungary. Ranked 19th in the short program, he qualified for the free skate where he placed 14th, rising to 15th overall.

In the 2014–15 season, Streubel trained under Anett Pötzsch in Dresden. He became the German national champion in December 2014. At the 2015 European Championships in Stockholm, Sweden, he placed 13th in both segments and overall.

Programs

Competitive highlights 
CS: Challenger Series; JGP: Junior Grand Prix

References

External links 
 
 Franz Streubel at Tracings

1991 births
German male single skaters
Living people
Figure skaters from Berlin